Saratoga Springs is a city in Saratoga, upstate New York.

Saratoga Springs may also refer to:

Saratoga Springs, California
Saratoga Springs, Utah
Saratoga Springs, Nebraska, a former town and now a neighborhood of Omaha
Disney's Saratoga Springs Resort & Spa, a resort hotel at Walt Disney World in Florida
Saratoga Springs (Death Valley), an oasis in California
Saratoga Springs (horse), a thoroughbred racehorse